1,1'-Dilithioferrocene is the organoiron compound with the formula Fe(C5H4Li)2.  It is exclusively generated and isolated as a solvate, using either ether or tertiary amine ligands bound to the lithium centers.  Regardless of the solvate, dilithioferrocene is used commonly to prepare derivatives of ferrocene.

Synthesis and reactions
Treatment of ferrocene with butyl lithium gives 1,1'-dilithioferrocene, regardless of the stoichiometry (monolithioferrocene requires special conditions for its preparation).  Typically the lithiation reaction is conducted in the presence of tetramethylethylenediamine (tmeda).  The adduct [Fe(C5H4Li)2]3(tmeda)2 has been crystallized from such solutions.  Recrystallization of this adduct from thf gives [Fe(C5H4Li)2]3(thf)6.

1,1'-Dilithioferrocene reacts with a variety of electrophiles to afford disubstituted derivatives of ferrocene.  These electrophiles include S8 (to give 1,1'-ferrocenetrisulfide), chlorophosphines, and chlorosilanes.

The diphosphine ligand 1,1'-bis(diphenylphosphino)ferrocene (dppf) is prepared by treating dilithioferrocene with chlorodiphenylphosphine.

Monolithioferrocene
The reaction of ferrocene with one equivalent of butyllithium mainly affords dilithioferrocene.  Monolithioferrocene can be obtained using tert-butyllithium.

References

Ferrocenes
Sandwich compounds
Cyclopentadienyl complexes
Organolithium compounds